Steven Jeffress (born 25 November 1975) is an Australian professional golfer.

Jeffress was born in Taree, New South Wales, Australia. He turned professional in 1999.

Jeffress has played on the PGA Tour of Australasia, Japan Golf Tour (2009 and 2014), and Asian Tour. He won his first PGA Tour of Australasia event in 2014 at the Fiji International. He is one of the few professional golfers to ever record a hole-in-one on a par 4 in a professional tournament at the 2007 New Zealand Open.

Professional wins (2)

PGA Tour of Australasia wins (1)

1Co-sanctioned by the OneAsia Tour

Von Nida Tour wins (1)

Results in major championships

CUT = missed the halfway cut

Results in World Golf Championships

"T" = Tied

References

External links

Australian male golfers
PGA Tour of Australasia golfers
Japan Golf Tour golfers
Sportsmen from New South Wales
People from Taree
1975 births
Living people